Robert Jaffray (January 23, 1832 – December 16, 1914) was a Canadian grocer, publisher (The Globe), and politician. A Liberal, he was appointed to the Senate of Canada on 8 March 1906 on the recommendation of Sir Wilfrid Laurier. He represented the senatorial division of Toronto, Ontario until his death. He is buried in Toronto's Mount Pleasant Cemetery.

His son Robert A. Jaffray was a Christian missionary to China who was trained by A.B. Simpson.

References 
 
 

1832 births
1914 deaths
Canadian senators from Ontario
Liberal Party of Canada senators